Clark Peak is a rock peak (645 m) surmounting a bluff on the west side of Larson Glacier in northern Edward VII Peninsula. Mapped by United States Geological Survey (USGS) from surveys and U.S. Navy aerial photographs, 1964-67. Named by Advisory Committee on Antarctic Names (US-ACAN) for Leroy Clark, member of the winter party of the Byrd Antarctic Expedition, 1933-35.

Mountains of Antarctica